Sir David Palmer Ross (13 September 1842 - 30 May 1904) was Surgeon General of the Colony of British Guiana.

Born in Penang on 13 September 1842, he was sent to Dumfries Academy to be educated, after the death of his parents.  In 1863, he received his medical degree from the University of Edinburgh and upon completion to up the post of medical officer to the Public Hospital in Jamaica.  He married Mary Eliza Heslop (daughter of the then Attorney General of Jamaica), he took up the post of Colonial Surgeon at Sierra Leone after rising to Superintendent Medical Officer in Jamaica. He was knighted by letters patent in 1900.

His eldest son was surgeon F. W. Forbes Ross. Sir David's other children were: George Herbert Kemp Ross, MD; James Reginal Blair Ross (who was a Chief Justice of Nigeria); Meta Mary Ruth Ross (who married Sir Alfred Van Waterschoodt Lucie-Smith, a former Chief Justice of Trinidad & Tobago); and Arthur Charles John Ross.

References 

Knights Bachelor
19th-century British medical doctors
British Guiana people
Companions of the Order of St Michael and St George
1842 births
1904 deaths